is a Japanese voice actress from Suginami, Tokyo. She is affiliated with Aoni Production.

Biography

Filmography

Television animation
 Princess Sarah (1985) – Lottie Legh
 Bosco Adventure (1986–1987) – Raby
 Dragon Ball (1986–1989) – Pu'ar, Snow, Mint
 Saint Seiya (1986–1990) – Miho
 Dragon Ball Z (1989–1996) – Chi-Chi (episode 88 onwards), Pu'ar
 Chibi Maruko-chan (1990–present) – Tamae Honami (Tama-chan)
 Dragon Ball GT (1996–1997) – Chi-Chi
 Tales of Destiny (1997) – Chelsea Torn
 Dragon Ball Kai (2009–2015) – Chi-Chi, Pu'ar
 Stitch! ~ Zutto Saikō no Tomodachi ~ (2010-2011) – Dark End
 Dragon Ball Super (2015–2018) – Chi-Chi, Pu'ar

Original video animation
Leda: The Fantastic Adventure of Yohko (1985) – Omuka
 Gall Force (1986-1992) - Catty
 Vampire Princess Miyu (1988–1989) – Miyu
 Dragon Ball Z Side Story: Plan to Eradicate the Saiyans (1993) - Chi-Chi
 Phantom Quest Corp. (1994-1995) - Sumei
 Haré+Guu (2001) – Guu
 Dragon Ball: Yo! Son Goku and His Friends Return!! (2008) – Chi-Chi, Pu'ar

Theatrical animation
Dragon Ball: Curse of the Blood Rubies (1986) – Pu'ar
Dragon Ball: Sleeping Princess in Devil's Castle (1987) – Pu'ar
Wicked City (1987) – Secretary
Dragon Ball: Mystical Adventure (1988) – Pu'ar
Dragon Ball Z: The Tree of Might (1990) – Pu'ar
Dragon Ball Z: Lord Slug (1991) – Chi-Chi
Dragon Ball Z: Cooler's Revenge (1991) – Chi-Chi
Dragon Ball Z: Super Android 13! (1992) − Chi-Chi
Dragon Ball Z: Broly – The Legendary Super Saiyan (1993) – Chi-Chi
Dragon Ball Z: Bojack Unbound (1993) – Chi-Chi
Dragon Ball Z: Fusion Reborn (1995) – Chi-Chi
Dragon Ball: The Path to Power (1996) – Pu'ar
Dragon Ball Z: Battle of Gods (2013) – Chi-Chi, Pu'ar, Marron
One Piece Film: Gold (2016) – Tempo
Dragon Ball Super: Broly (2018) - Gine

Video games
Ys I & II (1989) – Feena
Tales of Destiny (1997) – Chelsea Torn
Snow (2002) – Meiko Tachibana
Dragon Ball series (2003–present) – Pu'ar, Chi-Chi (Budokai 3 onwards)
Dragon Ball Fusions – Gine

Dubbing roles
Miracle on 34th Street – Susan Walker (Mara Wilson)

References

External links
 Official agency profile 
 

1959 births
Living people
People from Suginami
Japanese video game actresses
Japanese voice actresses
Nihon University alumni
20th-century Japanese actresses
21st-century Japanese actresses
Aoni Production voice actors